This is a list of programmes produced and broadcast on Mediacorp Channel 5, a television channel in Singapore. Lists of programmes includes those telecast when the channel was operated by Television Singapore, Radio Television Singapore (RTS), Singapore Broadcasting Corporation (SBC), Television Corporation of Singapore (TCS) and current operator Mediacorp TV, including the HD5 from 2007 to 2015.

Original programming

News
 English:
 Newsreel in English/Newsreel (15 February 1963-6 July 1974)
 Berita Singapura (15 February 1963-6 July 1974)
 News in English/News (7 July 1974-New Year's Eve 1993)
 News 5 at Seven (New Year's Day 1994-28 February 1999)
 News 5 Tonight (New Year's Day 1994-New Year's Eve 2014)
 News 5 Today (3 July 1995-26 February 1999)
 News 5 (New Year's Day 2015-18 October 2020)
 News Tonight (19 October 2020-now)
 Malay (until New Year's Eve 1993):
 Berita Singapura (15 February 1963-6 July 1974)
 News in Malay/Berita (7 July 1974-New Year's Eve 1993)

Current Affairs
 Talking Point
 Work.Able
 On The Red Dot
 Into The Vault
 The Best I Could

Drama
128 Circle
Crime and Passion
Crimewatch
Code Of Law
En Bloc
Fighting Spiders
First Touch
Growing Up
Heartlanders
The Kitchen Musical
Light Years
Lion Mums
Masters of the Sea
Mata Mata
Moulmein High
Parental Guidance
Point of Entry
Polo Boys
Premonition
Red Thread
 The Algorithm
Triple Nine
A War Diary
Left Behind
P.I
VR Man
Missing
Kin
Reunion
Lightspeed
Incredible Tales
Titoudao
This Land Is Mine
Home Is Where The Heart Is
Nightwatchers
The Algorithm
Classmates
 Tanglin
 Sunny Side Up
 Mata Mata
 The Girl He Never Noticed

Game/Reality/Variety shows
Deal or No Deal
The Pyramid Game
The Weakest Link
Sasuke Singapore
Singapore Idol
Who Wants to Be a Millionaire
The Arena
Asia Bagus
Asia's Got Talent
Asia's Next Top Model
Beauty Files
Celebrate
Coffee Talk and Hawker Woks
Extreme Gourmet
Extreme Japan
Food Chain
Girls Out Loud
Gotcha!
i Whiz
Just For Laughs Gags Asia
Kopitiam with Dick Lee
MasterChef Asia
MasterChef Singapore
Our Makan Places: Lost And Found
The Ra Ra Show
Seoul Far Seoul Good
Spell Cast
The Apprentice Asia
Wish You Were Here...?

Comedy
80's Rewind
ABC DJ
Achar
Calefare
Daddy's Girls
Gurmit's World
Just For Laughs Gags Asia
Living with Lydia
Maggi & Me
Mr Kiasu
My Sassy Neighbour
The Noose
Oh Carol!
Phua Chu Kang Pte Ltd
Phua Chu Kang Sdn Bhd
Police & Thief
Rojak
Spouse for House
Under One Roof
Yang Sisters
Fine Tune
 Meet The MP

Lifestyle
 Chic & Cosy
 My Little Chef
 This Weekend

Infotainment
 The World's Deadliest Weather
 Amazing Animal Friends
 Weather Gone Viral
 Weird Wonders Of The World
 Alaska: A Year In The Wild
 The Green Planet

Current Affairs
Behind Closed Doors
Creature Comforts
Generation Ex
The Grand Dame of Kallang
In and Out
Public Insight

TV Specials
Miss Singapore Universe

Sports
 Singapore Open
 Formula 1 Singapore Airlines Singapore Grand Prix
 S.League
 HSBC Women's Champions
 Prime League
 Singapore Cup

Syndicated programming

Comedy
30 Rock
The 5 Mrs. Buchanans
A Million Little Things
ALF
Alice
America's Funniest Home Videos
America's Funniest People
Are You Being Served?
The Benny Hill Show
Bernard and the Genie
Bewitched
A Bit of Fry & Laurie
Blackadder
Bonanza
Canned Laughter
Cashmere Mafia
Cheaters
Cheers
Clarissa Explains It All
Community
Crazy Ex-Girlfriend
The Cosby Show
The Days and Nights of Molly Dodd
Diff'rent Strokes
Drop Dead Diva
Everybody Loves Raymond
Father of the Pride
Fawlty Towers
Friends
Full House
Funny Business
George and Mildred
Glee
The Golden Girls
Growing Pains
Happy Hour
Help Me Help You
In Case of Emergency
The Innes Book of Records
I Dream of Jeannie
I Feel Bad
It's Garry Shandling's Show
The Jeffersons
Just for Laughs: Gags
The Knights of Prosperity
The Larry Sanders Show
The Love Boat
The Lucy Show
Married... with Children
Men Behaving Badly
The Michael J. Fox Show
Mind Your Language
Mr. Bean
My Big Fat Greek Life
The Nanny
The New Statesman
Not the Nine O'Clock News
The Office
Outsourced
Parks and Recreation
Perfect Strangers
The Planet's Funniest Animals
Rhoda
Roseanne
Sabrina the Teenage Witch
Saturday Live
Saved by the Bell
Sean Saves the World
The Secret Policeman's Ball
Seinfeld
Single Parents
Small Wonder
Speechless
Suddenly Susan
Taxi
The Mary Tyler Moore Show
The Thin Blue Line
The Unicorn
Two and a Half Men
Ugly Betty
United States
Who's the Boss?
World's Funniest Videos: Top 10 Countdown
Yes Minister
Zoey's Extraordinary Playlist

Entertainment
BET
BET Her

Lifestyle
 Famous Foodies
 Luke Nguyen's Food Trail
 Taste Of Australia with Hayden Quinn
 Euromaxx
 Arts 21
 Ainsley's Market Menu
 Clean It, Fix It

Game/Reality shows
America's Got Talent
America's Got Talent: The Champions
America's Next Top Model
The Apprentice
 Bachelor in Paradise Australia
 The Bachelor USA
 The Bachelorette USA
 The Bachelor Australia
 The Bachelor UK
 The Bachelorette Australia
Britain's Got Talent
Celebrity MasterChef Australia
Everyday Gourmet with Justine Schofield
Extreme Makeover
Good Chef Bad Chef
 Getaway
The Home Team
 Love Island UK
 Love Island USA
 Love Island Australia
MasterChef America
MasterChef Australia
MasterChef Australia All-Stars
MasterChef Australia: The Professionals
MasterChef UK
The Muppet Show
Planet Action
Pussycat Dolls Present: Girlicious
Pussycat Dolls Present: The Search for the Next Doll
Style By Jury
Survivor 43
Worst Bakers in America
Worst Cooks in America
The X Factor USA
The X Factor UK
1 vs. 100
American Gladiators
American Idol
Baby Ballroom: The Championship
Breaking the Magician's Code: Magic's Biggest Secrets Finally Revealed
The Crystal Maze
The Cube
Dancing with the Stars US
Deal or No Deal
Deal or No Deal (syndicated)
Don't Forget the Lyrics!
Dynamo: Magician Impossible
Ellen's Game of Games
I Can See Your Voice
Fear Factor USA
Fear Factor Australia
Fear Factor UK
Hole in the Wall
Million Dollar Listing Los Angeles
Million Dollar Listing Miami
Million Dollar Listing New York
Million Dollar Listing San Francisco
My Big Fat Obnoxious Boss
Name Your Adventure
The $100,000 Pyramid
The New Price Is Right
The Price Is Right
The Price Is Right $1,000,000 Spectacular
The Real Housewives of Orange County
The Real Housewives of New York City
The Real Housewives of Atlanta 
The Real Housewives of New Jersey
The Real Housewives of D.C.
The Real Housewives of Beverly Hills
The Real Housewives of Miami
The Real Housewives of Potomac
The Real Housewives of Dallas
The Real Housewives of Salt Lake City
Ripley's Believe It or Not!
Seconds From Disaster
Undercover Boss
The Wall (British game show)
Weakest Link (American game show)
E! Entertainment
E! Ashlee+Evan
E! Hollywood Divas
E! Hollywood Medium with Tyler Henry
E! Keeping Up with the Kardashians
E! Kourtney and Kim Take Miami
E! Kourtney and Kim Take New York
E! Life of Kylie
E! Model Squad
E! Revenge Body with Khloé Kardashian
E! Total Bellas
E! Total Divas
E! Very Cavallari
E! WAGS
E! WAGS Atlanta
E! WAGS Miami
WWE Entertainment
WWE Total Bellas
WWE Total Divas
Beat Shazam
Wipeout
 Wheel of Fortune
 Celebrity Wheel Of Fortune
 Who Wants To Be A Millionaire
 I Can See Your Voice USA
 The Void
 5 Gold Rings

Hollywood
 Films & Stars
 Kim Kardashian
 Khloé Kardashian
 Kourtney Kardashian
 Kendall Jenner
 Kylie Jenner

Talk/Infotainment
The Chew
The Dr. Oz Show
E! Entertainment
E! Investigates
E! News
E! True Hollywood Story
E! Live from the Red Carpet
The Ellen DeGeneres Show
The Kelly Clarkson Show
Late Night
Late Night with Conan O'Brien
Late Night with David Letterman
Late Night with Jimmy Fallon
Late Night with Seth Meyers
Let's Talk About Health
Martha
The Oprah Winfrey Show
Rachael Ray
The Revolution
Saturday Night Live
Saturday Night Live from New York City
Saturday Night Live Weekend Update Thursday
Saturday Night Live Band
The Tonight Show
The Tonight Show Starring Johnny Carson
The Tonight Show with Jay Leno
The Tonight Show with Conan O'Brien
The Tonight Show Starring Jimmy Fallon

TV Specials
American Music Awards
Academy Awards
Billboard Music Awards
Brit Awards
Grammy Awards
iHeartRadio Music Awards
Miss Earth
Miss International
Miss Universe
Miss World
MTV Europe Music Awards
MTV Movie & TV Awards
MTV Video Music Awards
E! Entertainment
E! People's Choice Awards
Cannes Film Festival
Venice Film Festival
Berlin International Film Festival
International luxury hotel
Park Hyatt
Grand Hyatt
Fairmont
Raffles
InterContinental
JW Marriott
Ritz-Carlton
St. Regis
Four Seasons
Langham
Mandarin Oriental
The Fullerton Hotel
Kempinski
FashionTV
The Story of Gucci
The Story of Prada
The Story of Versace
The Story of Louis Vuitton
The Story of Chanel
The Story of Dior
The Story of Hugo Boss
The Story of Cartier
The Story of Dolce & Gabbana
Luxury Cars
Luxury Resorts

Music
Solid Gold
MTV
MTV Live (International)
MTV Live (United States)
Universal Music Singapore
ABBA (Sweden)
Blackpink (South Korea)
BTS (South Korea)
Alessia Cara (Canada)
Billie Eilish
Lady Gaga
Selena Gomez
Ellie Goulding (United Kingdom)
Ariana Grande
Halsey
Carly Rae Jepsen (Canada)
Jessie J
Demi Lovato
Mabel (United Kingdom)
Julia Michaels (Republic)
Nicki Minaj
Olivia Newton-John (United States and Canada)
Lana Del Rey
Olivia Rodrigo
Hailee Steinfeld
Sabrina Carpenter
Sofia Carson
Taylor Swift
Polydor Records
ABBA (Sweden)
Blackpink (Polydor UK)
Lana Del Rey (Polydor UK)
Billie Eilish (Polydor UK)
Ellie Goulding (Polydor UK)
Carly Rae Jepsen (Polydor UK)
Julia Michaels (Polydor UK)
Lady Gaga (Polydor UK)
Mabel (United Kingdom)
Selena Gomez (Polydor UK)

Television series
21 Jump Street
90210
The A-Team
The Adventures of the Scarlet Pimpernel
The Adventures of Sinbad
Agatha Christie's Poirot
Airwolf
Ally McBeal
Angel
Another World
Baywatch
Baywatch Hawaii
Baywatch Nights
Beverly Hills, 90210
The Big Easy
Bionic Woman (1976)
Bionic Woman (2007)
The Blacklist
The Bold and the Beautiful
Bonanza
Bones
Brideshead Revisited
Burke's Law
Buffy the Vampire Slayer
Burn Notice
Camelot
Captain Power and the Soldiers of the Future
Charlie's Angels
Charmed (1998)
Charmed (2018)
Chicago Fire
Chicago Hope
Close to Home
Cold Case
Columbo
Commander in Chief
Crossing Lines
CSI: Crime Scene Investigation
CSI: Miami
CSI: NY
Dallas
Danger Bay
Desperate Housewives
Dirt
The Vampire Diaries
A Discovery of Witches
Doctor Who
Doogie Howser, M.D.
Due South
Early Edition
Earth 2
Empire
Eyes
FBI
FBI: Most Wanted
Felicity
FlashForward
Flipper
Friday the 13th: The Series
General Hospital
Glee
The Good Doctor
Grey's Anatomy
Grimm
The Guardian
Hannibal
Hawaii Five-O
Hercules: The Legendary Journeys
Heroes
High Tide
Home and Away
House M.D.
In the Dark
Jake and the Fatman
The Jesse Owens Story
The Jewel in the Crown
Jim Henson's The Storyteller
Journeyman
Knight Rider (1982)
Knight Rider (2008)
Kung Fu: The Legend Continues
Kyle XY
L.A.'s Finest
L.A. Law
La Femme Nikita
Law & Order
Law & Order: Criminal Intent
Law & Order: Special Victims Unit
Legend of the Seeker
Little House on the Prairie
Lost
MacGyver
Madam Secretary
Magnum, P.I.
Man from Atlantis
Marco Polo
Men in Trees
The Mentalist
Merlin
Miami Vice
My Family and Other Animals
Murder, She Wrote
Nancy Drew
NCIS: Hawaii
New Amsterdam
NYPD Blue
The O.C.
Once Upon a Time
The Pacific
Parenthood
Party of Five
Police Academy
The Practice
Presidio Med
The Pretender
Pride and Prejudice (1958)
Pride and Prejudice (1967)
Pride and Prejudice (1980)
Pride and Prejudice (1995)
Primeval
Private Practice
Probe
Quantum Leap
Renegade
The Resident
Revolution
Rich Man, Poor Man
Savannah
The Scarlet Pimpernel
Second Chances
The Secret Circle
Shark
 Sherlock Holmes (1951)
 Sherlock Holmes (1954)
 Sherlock Holmes (1965)
 Sherlock Holmes (1967)
 Sherlock Holmes (1968)
 Sherlock Holmes and Doctor Watson (1979)
 Sherlock Holmes (1984)
 Sherlock Holmes in the 22nd Century (1999)
 Sherlock Holmes (2013)
 Sherlock Holmes (2014)
Shōgun
Siberia
Silver Surfer
The Six Million Dollar Man
Sliders
Smallville
Space: Above and Beyond
Spenser: For Hire
Star Trek: The Next Generation
Star Wars: The Clone Wars
Stay the Night
Street Justice
Suits
Super Force
Supernatural
Terra Nova
Thunder in Paradise
Time Trax
Touched by an Angel
Tour of Duty
Treasure Island in Outer Space
The Twilight Zone
The Winds of War
Xena: Warrior Princess
The X-Files
Young Hercules

Sports
 Golf Channel
 PGA Tour
 Masters Tournament
 PGA Championship
 U.S. Open
 The Open Championship (British Open)
 European Tour
 Asian Tour
 Wimbledon
 FIFA World Cup
 AFF Championship
 Uber Cup
 Thomas Cup
 Commonwealth Games
 BWF World Championships
 Summer Olympic Games
 Winter Olympic Games
 Youth Olympic Games
 Southeast Asian Games
 Asian Games
 English Premier League
 La Liga
 Serie A
 Bundesliga
 Ligue 1
 UEFA Champions League
 UEFA Europa League
 UEFA European Championship
 Australian Open
 US Open
 French Open
 Formula One
 One Championship
 NBA
 NBA TV
 10 Before Tip
 3DTV
 Beyond The Paint
 Courtside Cinema
 Game Of The Day
 Hardwood Classics
 High Tops: Plays of the Month
 Inside the NBA
 NBA Action
 NBA CrunchTime
 NBA Gametime Live
 NBA Gametime Live Specials
 NBA Inside Stuff
 NBA TV Marquee Matchup
 NBA TV Originals
 Open Court
 Playoff Playback
 Shaqtin' a Fool
 Los Angeles Clippers
 Los Angeles Lakers
 NBA Seasons
 NBA Draft
 NBA Summer League
 NBA All-Star Weekend
 NBA All-Star Game
 NBA Global Games
 NBA Play-In
 NBA Playoffs
 NBA Finals

References

Mediacorp
Channel 5 Programmes
MediaCorp Channel 5